The Headies Award for Album of the Year is an award presented at The Headies, a ceremony that was established in 2006 and originally called the Hip Hop World Awards. It was first awarded to Get Squared in 2006.

Recipients

Category records
Most wins

Most nominations

Notes

References

The Headies
Album awards